Fauzi Adnan (born 3 June 1987) is an Indonesian badminton player. Born in Klaten, Central Java, he trained at the Suryanaga Surabaya club. He was the bronze medalists at the 2005 Asian Junior Championships in the boys' singles and team event. Teamed-up with Trikusuma Wardhana in the men's doubles, they claimed the Grand Prix title at the 2009 India Open Grand Prix. In the singles event, he was the finalists at the 2009 Indonesia and Singapore International tournaments.

Achievements

Asian Junior Championships 
Boys' singles

BWF Grand Prix 
The BWF Grand Prix had two levels, the BWF Grand Prix and Grand Prix Gold. It was a series of badminton tournaments sanctioned by the Badminton World Federation (BWF) which was held from 2007 to 2017.

Men's doubles

  BWF Grand Prix Gold tournament
  BWF Grand Prix tournament

BWF International Challenge/Series 
Men's singles

  BWF International Challenge tournament
  BWF International Series tournament

References

External links 
 

1987 births
Living people
People from Klaten Regency
Sportspeople from Central Java
Indonesian male badminton players
21st-century Indonesian people